Hans Frederick Arthur Schoenfeld (January 31, 1889 Providence, Rhode Island–1952) was an American Career Foreign Service Officer. On three occasions, he was commissioned to be an Envoy Extraordinary and Minister Plenipotentiary but did not serve (Bulgaria, 1928 and 1929; Costa Rica 1929) but he did serve as Envoy Extraordinary and Minister Plenipotentiary to the Dominican Republic (1931–1937), Finland (1937–1942) and Hungary (1946–1947). He was also Chargé d'Affaires in Mexico City.

Biography
Schoenfeld is a graduate of the George Washington University where he received both a bachelor's degree and a master's degree. He taught history there for several years.

References

External links
The Acting Secretary of State to the United States Representative in Hungary (Schoenfeld)

George Washington University alumni
George Washington University faculty
Ambassadors of the United States to Mexico
Ambassadors of the United States to the Dominican Republic
Ambassadors of the United States to Finland
United States Foreign Service personnel
1889 births
1952 deaths